Joseph Cable (April 17, 1801 – May 1, 1880) was an American lawyer and politician who served as a U.S. Representative from Ohio for two terms from 1849 to 1853. He was the great-grandfather of Congressman John Levi Cable.

Life and career 
Born in Jefferson County, then in the Territory Northwest of the River Ohio (now in the State of Ohio), Cable attended the public schools. He studied law. He was admitted to the bar and commenced practice in Jefferson County. He established and published the Jeffersonian and Democrat at Steubenville, Ohio, in 1831 and later the Ohio Patriot at New Lisbon, Ohio.

Congress 
Cable was elected as a Democrat to the Thirty-first and Thirty-second Congresses (March 4, 1849 – March 3, 1853), while living in Carroll County.
He was not a candidate for renomination in 1852.

Later life
He moved to Sandusky, Ohio, in 1853 and published the Daily Sandusky Minor, until moving to Van Wert in 1857 and establishing the American and later the Bulletin.  After a time living in Wauseon and publishing the Wauseon Republican, he moved to Paulding, where he published the Political Review.

Death
He died on May 1, 1880, and was interred in Live Oak Cemetery.

References

1801 births
1880 deaths
People from Jefferson County, Ohio
People from Carroll County, Ohio
19th-century American newspaper publishers (people)
Ohio lawyers
19th-century American journalists
American male journalists
19th-century American male writers
19th-century American politicians
Democratic Party members of the United States House of Representatives from Ohio
Journalists from Ohio
People from Steubenville, Ohio
People from Sandusky, Ohio
People from Wauseon, Ohio
People from Paulding, Ohio
19th-century American lawyers